Yolandi van der Westhuizen (born 11 December 1981) is a South African former cricketer and current cricket coach. She played as a right-handed batter and wicket-keeper. She appeared in eight One Day Internationals and 12 Twenty20 Internationals for South Africa between 2009 and 2014. She played domestic cricket for Western Province and Boland.

In 2021, she was appointed as Head Coach of Boland's women's team, becoming the first woman to coach the side.

References

External links
 
 

1981 births
Living people
Cricketers from Cape Town
South African women cricketers
South Africa women One Day International cricketers
South Africa women Twenty20 International cricketers
Boland women cricketers
Western Province women cricketers
West Coast women cricketers
South African cricket coaches
Wicket-keepers